55th Street is a two-mile-long, one-way street traveling east to west across Midtown Manhattan.

Landmarks, east to west

Sutton Place South
The route officially begins at Sutton Place South which is on a hill overlooking FDR Drive.  
Plaza 400 Apartments, 40-story, 119 m/392 ft apartment building completed in 1967 (north)

First Avenue
Terrence Cardinal Cook Building (south)
Church of St. John the Evangelist (south)
Bristol Apartments, 33-story apartment building completed in 1973

Second Avenue
Brevard Apartments, 30-story apartments completed in 1981
Marymount Manhattan College Dormitory, 48-story, 144 m / 473 ft mixed apartment house and dormitory completed in 2001  (north)

Third Avenue
919 Third Avenue, 47-story 188 m / 615 ft building completed in 1971 (north)
P. J. Clarke's, antique tavern known for holding its own and remaining intact despite attempts to destroy it for 919 Third. (north)

Lexington Avenue
Central Synagogue 
DLT Entertainment headquarters 
Hong Kong Economic and Trade Office
Levin Institute

Park Avenue
Park Avenue Place,  38-story,  office tower completed in 2004 (south)
Park Avenue Tower, 36-story,  office tower completed in 1987 with a distinctive pyramid roof (north)
Heron Tower, 25-story building completed in 1986

Madison Avenue
550 Madison Avenue, 37-story,  building completed in 1984 originally to be the headquarters of AT&T and later Sony USA (north)
Finland House, 38-story,  office tower completed in 1970  (north)
The St. Regis Hotel

Fifth Avenue
The Peninsula New York, 21-story,  hotel completed in 1905 (south)
Fifth Avenue Presbyterian Church (north)
MGM Building, 35-story,  office tower completed in 1966 (south)
Rockefeller Apartments (south)
46 West 55th Street (south), a landmarked house

Sixth Avenue

Robert Indiana Love (sculpture) (south)
Capitol-EMI Building 34-story,  building (north)
1345 Avenue of the Americas, 50 story,  building completed in 1969 (south)
125 West 55th Street (north)
New York City Center, theatre at 131 West 55th Street (north)
55th Street Playhouse, theatre at 154 West 55th Street
CitySpire Center (north), 75-story,  tower (tallest on street), north
The London NYC 54-floor,  tower completed in 1990 (south)
Hotel Wellington (north)

Seventh Avenue
Park Central Hotel, 25-story,  tower completed in 1926 most famous for mafia execution in the barber shop (north)
Dream Hotel (south)
Mutual of New York Building, 27-story,  building completed in 1950 whose sign inspired the song Mony, Mony

Broadway
Random House Tower, 52-story,  tower (north)
Former original location of Soup Nazi from Seinfeld

Eighth Avenue
The Starwood Apts. at 321 West 55th Street was built in 1907. It is one of the oldest apartment buildings on the west Side of New York. Over the years it has been the residence of such theater luminaries as Tony Award winners Jane Alexander (former head of the National Endowment for the Arts) and Michael Stewart, librettist of Hello, Dolly!

Ninth Avenue
Alvin Ailey Dance Hall (north)
Julia Miles Theatre (Off Broadway venue) (south)
Independent High School (north)

Tenth Avenue

Clinton Towers Apartments 39-story apartment completed in 1974

Eleventh Avenue

Twelfth Avenue/West Side Highway
The road crosses a pedestrian island separating 12th Avenue from the West Side Highway (one of the few places where 12th and the West Side Highway are not the same). The route concludes at the West Side Highway (New York Route 9A). Opposite the intersection is the Hudson River Park and Hudson River.

References
Notes

External links

55th Street: A New York Songline - virtual walking tour

055
Midtown Manhattan